Bettina Heinicke née Blumenberg (born 20 November 1962, in Braunschweig, Germany) is a German former field hockey player who competed in the 1988 Summer Olympics. In total, she represented West Germany in 79 matches.

References

External links
 

1962 births
Living people
German female field hockey players
Olympic field hockey players of West Germany
Field hockey players at the 1988 Summer Olympics
Sportspeople from Braunschweig